The Shenyang Metro is a rapid transit system serving the city of Shenyang, Liaoning, China. It's the seventh operational subway system in Mainland China and the first in Northeast China.

The system connects with the Shenyang Modern Tram system in the southern part of the city.

Overview
Line 9 opened on May 25, 2019. The line is 28.996 km in length. Line 10 opened on April 29, 2020.

The construction of Line 1 started on November 18, 2005. Trial service not open to the public started in September 2009, with the line fully operational in September 2010. The total cost of Line 1 was 8.88 billion yuan (USD 1.1 billion).

A Line 2 extension to Hangkonghangtiandaxue station opened on December 30, 2013. Another extension to Putianlu station opened on April 8, 2018.

The original loop line is broken into two "L"-shaped lines, Line 9 and Line 10, that intersect twice to form a loop. Line 9 opened on May 25, 2019. The line is 28.996 km in length. Line 10 opened on April 29, 2020.

Lines

History

Shenyang was one of the first Chinese cities with a metro plan. The initial plan of building a metro system in Shenyang was proposed as early as 1940, during the Manchukuo era with an Osaka-based company proposing a  metro network. However, chaos caused by the Second Sino-Japanese War and Chinese Civil Wars meant the plan could not be implemented.

After the wars, the metro program was revived again when the Chinese government decided that the four biggest cities at that time, Beijing, Shanghai, Tianjin, and Shenyang should build metro systems for transportation and military purposes. The subway was envisioned to also function as an air raid shelter in an event of war.

Construction in of the metro started in 1965 but was stopped shortly after due to the turmoil from the Cultural Revolution. Only the initial sections of the Beijing Subway and Tianjin Metro managed to be completed. Construction was restarted in 1974, on a line roughly following today's Line 1. In 1978 with government personnel from Harbin, Tianjin and Shanghai visiting to Shenyang to learn about the subway construction experience.

In 1982, subway construction was halted due to lack of funds and resources. The approximately 3 km long half completed tunnel was abandoned and filled with water. While the Shanghai Metro was put into service in 1995, the economic decline of Shenyang during the 1980s-1990s meant that there was no capital available for subway construction and the program was continually postponed.

A light rail system was designed in the early 1990s as a cheaper alternative, however this plan was also abandoned after a national suspension of subway projects was declared due to worries of high cost and financial debt.

Shenyang's economy revived in 2000, and with it growing traffic congestion and pollution caused by the expanding urban population. This prompted the Chinese central government to approve the subway proposal on November 8, 2005. Construction of the first phase of Line 1 started on November 18, 2005, with the entire phase opened on September 27, 2010, after trial operation in September 2009. The line have 22 stations and went from Shisanhaojie to Limingguangchang station. Line 2 started trail operation on December 30, 2011 and was fully opened on January 9, 2012. Line 2 extended twice in 2013 and 2018 and currently have 26 stations. Line 9 opened on May 25, 2019. Line 10 opened on April 29, 2020.

Future development
Shenyang Metro will be 267 km in 2024. There are four lines/extensions in the 2019-2024 Shenyang Metro expansion plan (Line 2 Southern extension, Line 3 Phase 1, Line 6 Phase 1, Line 1 Eastern extension).

Network map

See also

 List of metro systems

References

External links
 Shenyang Metro 
 UrbanRail: Shenyang

 
Rapid transit in China
Transport in Shenyang
Railway lines opened in 2010
2010 establishments in China
Projects established in 1940